"The Same Love That Made Me Laugh" is a song, composed and originally recorded by Bill Withers, which was included on his 1974 album +'Justments. Released as a single, it reached No. 50 on the U.S. Billboard Hot 100 chart and No. 10 R&B. The song reached the Top 40 in Canada.

Chart history

Other versions
Diana Ross covered "The Same Love That Made Me Laugh" on her 1977 LP Baby It's Me.

References

External links
 
 

Sussex Records singles
1974 songs
1974 singles
Songs written by Bill Withers
Bill Withers songs
Diana Ross songs